The Glenwood Springs Post Independent is a daily newspaper distributed in Garfield County, Colorado. The publication covers the municipalities of Glenwood Springs, Carbondale, New Castle, Silt, Rifle and Parachute.

The Glenwood Springs Post Independent was created in November 2000, by the merger of the historic Glenwood Post and Glenwood Independent, and is owned by Swift Communications of Carson City, Nevada. The publication is a member of the Colorado Press Association.

In 2017, Post Independent staffers found photo negatives featuring the notorious American serial killer Ted Bundy that were kept in an old safe at their Glenwood Springs office since the 1970s. The negatives show Bundy at the Garfield county jail, and scenes from the search for him after he escaped from both the Pitkin and Garfield county jails.

References

External links 
 

Glenwood Springs, Colorado
Daily newspapers published in the United States
Newspapers published in Colorado